Pilar Pérez (born 22 September 1973) is a former professional tennis player from Spain.

Biography
Pérez, who began competing on the ITF circuit in the 1989 season, was the Orange Bowl champion in 1990, becoming the first Spanish female to win the prestigious junior tournament.

As a 16-year old she featured in two Federation Cup ties for Spain, as the doubles partner of Conchita Martinez. Pérez and Martinez were beaten in both matches. This included the deciding rubber of the 1990 World Group semifinal against the USSR, as a replacement for Arantxa Sánchez Vicario, who was injured during her singles match.

She played only briefly on the WTA Tour, from 1990 to 1991. 

At the 1991 Mediterranean Games, Pérez won a silver in the singles and a bronze in the doubles event.

ITF Circuit finals

Singles: 1 (runner-up)

See also
 List of Spain Fed Cup team representatives

References

External links
 
 
 

1973 births
Living people
Spanish female tennis players
Mediterranean Games silver medalists for Spain
Mediterranean Games bronze medalists for Spain
Competitors at the 1991 Mediterranean Games
Mediterranean Games medalists in tennis